Danskegattet is a strait in Albert I Land at Spitsbergen, Svalbard. It is located between Danes Island to the south and Amsterdam Island to the north, leading into Smeerenburgfjorden. A common anchorage is west of Virgohamna.

References

Straits of Svalbard
Landforms of Spitsbergen
Danskøya
Amsterdamøya